One Day in August is a 2001 Greek drama film directed by Constantine Giannaris.

Cast 
 Eleni Kastani - Morfoula
 Akilas Karazisis - Fanis
 Amalia Moutoussi - Katia
 Emilios Chilakis - Kostas
 Theodora Tzimou - Sandra
 Michalis Iatropoulos - Mihalis

References

External links 

2001 drama films
2001 films
Greek drama films